Grotta may refer to: 

 Grotto (Italian: Grotta), a small natural or artificial cave 
 Grótta, a tied island in Seltjarnarnes, Iceland
 Grótta Sports Club in Iceland
 , an archaeological site in Naxos after which the Grotta-Pelos culture is named

See also 
 
 Grottasöngr, an Old Norse poem
 Grotte (disambiguation)